Brædstrup is a former railway town in Jutland, Denmark at the railway between Horsens and Silkeborg which was closed in 1968. Until 1 January 2007 it was the municipal seat of the former Brædstrup Municipality and today, with a population of 3,992 (1 January 2022), it is the second largest town of Horsens Municipality, Central Denmark Region in Denmark.

Notable people 
 Henrik Stubkjær (born 1961 in Brædstrup) a Danish theologian and Bishop of Viborg
 Kristian Thulesen Dahl (born 1969 in Brædstrup) a Danish politician, leader of the Danish People's Party since 2012, member of the Folketing since 1994.
 Allan Søgaard (born 1978 in Brædstrup) a Danish former football player, 304 caps with AC Horsens
 Mette Abildgaard (born 1988 in Føvling at Brædstrup) a Danish politician, member of the Folketing

Photo Gallery

References 

Cities and towns in the Central Denmark Region
Company towns
Horsens Municipality